"Never Knew Love" is a pop song performed by the English singer Rick Astley and written by Derek Bordeaux and John Paul Taylor. It was produced by Gary Stevenson and Astley. The song was recorded for and included in Astley's third album, Free. It was released on 23 June 1991 and peaked at number 70 in the UK Singles Chart.

Track listing
"Never Knew Love" (Remix) - 3:15
"Never Knew Love" (The 3 Day Mix) - 8:37
"So Glad" - 3:28
"Some Kinda Love" - 4:35

Personnel 
 Rick Astley – lead vocals 
 Dave West – acoustic piano, Fender Rhodes, synthesizers, drum programming 
 Hywel Maggs – guitars 
 Lars Danielsson – bass guitar
 Per Lindval – drum overdubs
 Jacob Andersen – percussion 
 Dan Higgins – saxophone solo 
 Larry Williams – saxophones 
 Bill Reichenbach Jr. – trombone 
 Larry Hall – trumpet 
 Jerry Hey – brass arrangements 
 Anne Dudley – string arrangements and conductor 
 Kevin Dorsey – backing vocals 
 Carol Kenyon – backing vocals 
 Dee Lewis – backing vocals 
 Phil Perry – backing vocals

References
Move Right Out single at Rickastley.co.uk

1991 singles
Rick Astley songs
RCA Records singles
1991 songs